Battle was an unincorporated community and coal town located in Carbon County, Wyoming, United States.

References

Unincorporated communities in Carbon County, Wyoming
Unincorporated communities in Wyoming
Coal towns in Wyoming